Montparnasse Bienvenue may refer to:

 Montparnasse Bienvenue (film)
 Montparnasse – Bienvenüe (Paris Métro)